The 2022 St Albans City and District Council election took place on 5 May 2022, to elect members of St Albans City and District Council in England. It was on the same day as other local elections. 

The whole council was up for election on new boundaries. At the election, the Liberal Democrats retained control of the council with a greatly increased majority, while Labour were eliminated from the council entirely.

Summary

Election result

|-

Ward results
Candidates seeking re-election are marked with an asterisk (*).

Batchwood

Bernards Heath

 -->

Clarence

Colney Heath

 -->

Cunningham

 -->

Harpenden East

 -->

Harpenden North & Rural

 -->

Harpenden South

 -->

Harpenden West

 

 -->

Hill End

 -->

London Colney

 -->

Marshalwick East & Jersey Farm

 -->

Marshalwick West

 

 -->

Park Street

 -->

Redbourn

 

 -->

Sandridge & Wheathampstead

 -->

Sopwell

St Peter's

St Stephen

Verulam

References

Saint Albans
St Albans City and District Council elections
May 2022 events in the United Kingdom
2020s in Hertfordshire